John Guiher Hutchinson (born February 4, 1935) is a retired American politician, who served briefly as member of the United States House of Representatives from West Virginia's 3rd congressional district. He is a Democrat.

Hutchinson was born in Charleston. He graduated from West Virginia University in Morgantown in 1956. Before entering politics, he served from 1956 to 1958 in the United States Air Force, and rose to rank of first lieutenant.

Hutchinson's public service career began in 1967, when he became Charleston treasurer, a post he held until 1971. He then served as Mayor of Charleston, the capital of West Virginia, from 1971 until 1980.

When longtime Congressman and fellow Democrat John M. Slack, Jr. died in office on March 17, 1980, Hutchinson won the special election to fill Slack's vacancy in Congress. His short tenure began on June 30, 1980, and ended on January 3, 1981.

Hutchinson was defeated for his bid for his own full term by Republican nominee Mick Staton. However, Staton himself served only one term before being defeated by Democrat Bob Wise. This brought about a very rare situation in the U.S. House, where three men represented the same district within a three-year period, from 1980 to 1983. In sharp contrast, the last of those men, Wise, went on to serve for nine terms before becoming governor in 2001.

After leaving politics, Hutchinson became a business executive in Charleston, where he currently resides.

See also
 List of mayors of Charleston, West Virginia

References

External links
 

1935 births
Military personnel from West Virginia
Businesspeople from Charleston, West Virginia
Living people
Mayors of Charleston, West Virginia
United States Air Force officers
West Virginia University alumni
Democratic Party members of the United States House of Representatives from West Virginia
20th-century American politicians
City and town treasurers in the United States
20th-century American businesspeople